Lekunberri (Basque= Lekuberri (New place)) is a municipality located in the province and autonomous community of Navarre (Navarra/Nafarroa), northern Spain. It is situated in the northwestern portion of the province, some 30 km from the provincial capital, Pamplona. Lekunberri has a population of 1,386.

Celebrity residents 
All alternative rock band Berri Txarrak members come from Lekunberri.

References

External links
 LEKUNBERRI in the Bernardo Estornés Lasa - Auñamendi Encyclopedia (Euskomedia Fundazioa) 

Municipalities in Navarre